Honggor Sum (Mongolian: soft, or sweetheart) is a sum in the Siziwang Banner of Ulanqab, Inner Mongolia, China. In 2000, it had 2594 inhabitants.

References

Township-level divisions of Inner Mongolia
Ulanqab